Cawayan, officially the Municipality of Cawayan,  is a 2nd class municipality in the province of Masbate, Philippines. According to the 2020 census, it has a population of 69,265 people.

Cawayan had an approximate income of Php 90,785,714.09 in 2012.

History
Cawayan was created as a municipality from portions of Milagros through Executive Order No. 244 signed by President Elpidio Quirino on July 18, 1949.

Geography

Barangays
Cawayan is politically subdivided into 37 barangays.

Climate

Demographics

Economy

Agriculture

The locals of Cawayan still largely depend on subsistence farming despite its topographic advantage to adapt commercial farming. The lack of funding for agriculture and infrastructure and its political insecurity due to the presence and activities of armed groups kept by political families and other subversive elements hinder the town's progress in spite of its geographical benefits.

Being primarily plain and flat, Cawayan is conducive to cattle farming. Grasslands are abundant in the plains and in the gentle slopes of the valleys and hills. However, land grabbing issues still prevail as evidenced by hectares of private enclosures locally known as "ranchos" that run miles after miles. Herds of cattle inside the fence barrier are visible from the national road as one travels into the interior making Cawayan a major player in the cattle industry of the province.

Cawayan has several outlying islands crucial to its local fishing industries. These islands provide most of the marine resources to cater to the needs in the mainland. Barter trade is still practiced on Sundays, the town's busiest day.

Copra farming is also popular in Cawayan.

Infrastructure

 Cawayan Port Improvement Project

The P42.95-million Cawayan Port Improvement Project in Barangay Mahayahay included the construction of rock causeway, back-up area, RC platform, RoRo ramp and breasting dolphin, as well as port lighting system, and mooring and fendering system. The project was completed on January 26, 2009.

The construction of this facility has drawn various forms of criticism. Nothing since the road construction project years way back that paved the national highway for a smooth access to other places had the townsfolk witnessed the unveiling of this multi-million project with such warm welcome. However, it was also evident that the materials used were substandard due to its massive damage when a typhoon struck the area months after its completion. Nevertheless, there was no denying of its economic contribution that further flourished open trade in the Visayan nautical radius.

 RoRo Project

Other than the local outrigger boat operators, a shipping company provides services to cater to the town's need of reliable vessel to transfer commodities to and from Cawayan for trade. It departs daily from Cawayan usually at 12:00 noon for a six-hour trip and docks at Pulambato Port in Bogo, Cebu. And at around 12:00 midnight it sails back to Cawayan Port.

For about two years, the RoRo vessel stopped operating in Cawayan, but on October 10, 2012, RoRo service was restarted.

Industry
A local crab meat processing industry operates in Peña Island owned by Arturo Marcaida Jr.  He is considered as the most successful fisherman who made it big in fish culture and fish processing business not only in Masbate but in the entire Bicol Region which earned for him the title “Crab King".

Another booming industry of the town is the dried fish industry.

Tourism

Cawayan is naturally blessed with beautiful places. Famous hang-outs and tourist spots include the Station of the Cross atop Mount Begia; tropical islets of Naro and Peña; a marine sanctuary across Recodo Bay; and a wide stretch of beaches among others.

Tourists can also enjoy visiting downtown during Sundays at Barangay Divisoria which has one of the largest open markets in the Philippines.

Education

Secondary schools:
 Western Masbate Roosevelt High School
 Naro National High School
 Villahermosa National High School
 Malbug High School
 Madbad National High School

Tertiary schools:
 Atty. Manuel B. Abinuman Memorial Colleges, Inc.

References

External links

LGU Cawayan Masbate Website
 [ Philippine Standard Geographic Code]
Philippine Census Information
Local Governance Performance Management System

Municipalities of Masbate
Establishments by Philippine executive order